Helmut Wojciech Pniociński (22 February 1944 – 1973) was a Polish handball player who competed in the 1972 Summer Olympics.

He was born in Chorzów.

In 1972 he was part of the Polish team which finished tenth in the Olympic tournament. He played four matches.

External links

References

1944 births
1973 deaths
Polish male handball players
Olympic handball players of Poland
Handball players at the 1972 Summer Olympics
Sportspeople from Chorzów